OSI-7904 is a noncompetitive liposomal thymidylate synthase inhibitor. OSI-7904 is a benzoquinazoline folate analog with antineoplastic activity. As a thymidylate synthase inhibitor, OSI-7904 noncompetitively binds to thymidylate synthase, resulting in inhibition of thymine nucleotide synthesis and DNA replication.

OSI-7904L is a liposome-encapsulated formulation of OSI-7904. Liposome encapsulation improves the efficacy and increases the half-life of OSI-7904.

Its effect on solid tumors is currently under evaluation.

References

Experimental cancer drugs
Dicarboxylic acids